Utricularia westonii is a terrestrial carnivorous plant that belongs to the genus Utricularia (family Lentibulariaceae). It is named for Dr. A. Weston who first discovered this species in 1971. It is endemic to Cape Le Grand National Park in Western Australia. It is the only member of section Tridentaria.

See also 
 List of Utricularia species

References 

Carnivorous plants of Australia
Eudicots of Western Australia
westonii
Lamiales of Australia